Shim Dong-woon (born 3 March 1990) is a South Korean footballer who plays as a winger for Seongnam FC in the K League 1.

Career

He joined Jeonnam Dragons in 2012. He made his first appearance at opening match of K-League 2012 against Gangwon FC.

External links 

1990 births
Living people
South Korean footballers
Association football wingers
Jeonnam Dragons players
Pohang Steelers players
Gimcheon Sangmu FC players
FC Anyang players
Seongnam FC players
K League 1 players
K League 2 players
Dankook University alumni